Gott's Roadside is a Northern California restaurant group with seven locations in the San Francisco Bay Area. As an “idealized version of the American roadside stand” and diner concept, the family-owned company's niche is fast food made with ingredients from local purveyors cooked to-order, including hamburgers and Ahi burgers, salads, French fries, and milkshakes, plus seasonal specials like the “Seoul” pork burger with kimchi and the B.L.T. with heirloom tomatoes. On July 25, 2017, Gott's started serving the vegan Impossible burger.

When the owners of a burger shack in St. Helena—Taylor's Refresher—decided to lease out their 50-year-old property, brothers Joel and Duncan Gott capitalized the opportunity to run their own restaurant.  The restaurant became Taylor's Automatic Refresher when the first location re-opened in St. Helena in 1999, and (in the aftermath of a trademark dispute, and over the protests of the Taylor family) was renamed in 2010 as Gott's Roadside.

The restaurants embrace a California-casual cooking style, featuring microbrewed beer and wines alongside chili cheese dogs and mini corn dogs. In 2004, a second Gott's opened in the Ferry Building Marketplace in San Francisco, and in 2007, a third opened in the Oxbow Public Market of Napa. The St. Helena spot is a drive-in, with seating at red picnic tables on the lawn, while the other two locations are built in an urban, retro diner-style. In 2013, a fourth location opened in Palo Alto. The newest Gott's Roadside location is now open in Greenbrae in Marin County. The company remains privately owned.

In 2006 Taylor's received the James Beard Foundation Award designating them as one of America's Classics. In addition to The New York Times and Food & Wine, Taylor's/Gott's has been featured in USA Today, Bon Appétit, Gourmet, Travel + Leisure, Robert M. Parker Jr.'s The Wine Advocate. and the Food Network's Diners, Drive-Ins, and Dives Season 1, Episode 9

Gallery

References

External links 

 

Restaurants established in 1999
Regional restaurant chains in the United States
Restaurants in the San Francisco Bay Area
St. Helena, California
1999 establishments in California
James Beard Foundation Award winners